Lake Magadi is the southernmost lake in the Kenyan Rift Valley, lying in a catchment of faulted volcanic rocks, north of Tanzania's Lake Natron. During the dry season, it is 80% covered by soda and is well known for its wading birds, including flamingos.

Lake Magadi is a saline, alkaline lake, approximately 100 square kilometers in size, that lies in an endorheic basin formed by a graben. The lake is an example of a "saline pan". The lake water, which is a dense sodium carbonate brine, precipitates vast quantities of the mineral trona (sodium sesquicarbonate). In places, the salt is up to 40 m thick. The lake is recharged mainly by saline hot springs (temperatures up to 86 °C) that discharge into alkaline "lagoons" around the lake margins, there being little surface runoff in this arid region. Most hot springs lie along the northwestern and southern shorelines of the lake. During the rainy season, a thin (less than 1 m) layer of brine covers much of the saline pan, but this evaporates rapidly leaving a vast expanse of white salt that cracks to produce large polygons. A single species of fish, a cichlid Alcolapia grahami, inhabits the hot, highly alkaline waters of this lake basin and is commonly seen in some of the hot spring pools around the shoreline, where the water temperature is less than 45 °C.

Lake Magadi was not always so saline. Several thousand years ago (during the late Pleistocene to mid-Holocene in the African humid period), the Magadi basin held a freshwater lake with many fish, whose remains are preserved in the High Magadi Beds, a series of lacustrine and volcaniclastic sediments preserved in various locations around the present shoreline. Evidence also exists for several older Pleistocene precursor lakes that were much larger than present Lake Magadi. At times, Lake Magadi and Lake Natron were united as a single larger lake.

Lake Magadi is also well known for its extensive deposits of siliceous chert. There are many varieties including bedded cherts that formed in the lake and intrusive dike-like bodies that penetrated through overlying sediments while the silica was soft. Most famous is "Magadi-type chert", which formed from a sodium silicate mineral precursor magadiite that was discovered at Lake Magadi in 1967.

Magadiite, a rare hydrous sodium-silicate mineral [NaSi7O13(OH)3·4(H2O)], was discovered about 50 years ago in sediments around Lake Magadi, a hypersaline alkaline lake fed by hot springs in the semi-arid southern Kenya Rift Valley. Today this harsh lacustrine environment excludes most organisms except microbial extremophiles, a few invertebrates (mostly insects), highly adapted fish (Alcolapia sp.), and birds including flamingos. Burrows discovered in outcrops of the High Magadi Beds (~25–9 ka) that predate the modern saline (trona) pan show that beetles and other invertebrates inhabit this extreme environment when conditions become more favourable. Burrows (cm-scale) preserved in magadiite in the High Magadi Beds are filled with mud, silt and sand from overlying sediments. Their stratigraphic context reveals upward-shallowing cycles from mud to interlaminated mud-magadiite to magadiite in dm-scale units. The burrows were formed when the lake floor became fresher and oxygenated, after a period when magadiite precipitated in shallow saline waters. The burrows, probably produced by beetles, show that trace fossils can provide evidence for short-term (possibly years to decades) changes in the contemporary environment that might not otherwise be recognised or preserved physically or chemically in the sediment record.

Magadi township lies on the lake's east shore, and is home to the Magadi Soda factory, owned by Tata India since December 2005. This factory produces soda ash, which has a range of industrial uses.

The lake is featured in Fernando Meirelles's film The Constant Gardener, which is based on the book of the same name by John le Carré, and is used as a stand-in for Lake Turkana in the north of Kenya, where the book and film are set.

A causeway that crosses the lake provides access to the area west of the lake (Nguruman Escarpment). Recently accommodation for tourists is provided in air conditioned canvas tents.

See also
 Lake Magadi another alkaline lake in the Ngorongoro Conservation Area in Northern Tanzania. 
 Lake Makgadikgadi. a paleo lake once situated in the Kalahari desert in Botswana until 10,000 years ago.

References

 Baker, B.H. 1958. Geology of the Magadi area. Report of the Geological Survey of Kenya, 42, 81 pp.
 Behr, H.J. 2002. Magadiite and Magadi chert: a critical analysis of the silica sediments in the Lake Magadi Basin, Kenya. SEPM Special Publication 73, p. 257-273.
 Eugster, H.P. 1970. Chemistry and origin of the brines from Lake Magadi, Kenya. Mineralogical Society of America Special Paper, No. 3, p. 215-235.
 Eugster, H.P. 1980. Lake Magadi, Kenya, and its Pleistocene precursors. In Nissenbaum, A. (Editor) Hypersaline brines and evaporitic environments. Elsevier, Amsterdam, pp. 195–232.
 Jones, B.F., Eugster, H.P., and Rettig, S.L. 1977. Hydrochemistry of the Lake Magadi basin, Kenya. Geochimica et Cosmochimica Acta, v. 41, p. 53-72.

External links

Slide show of aerial photos by Christophe Gruault at Fotopedia

Lakes of Kenya
Endorheic lakes of Africa
Saline lakes of the Great Rift Valley